Wing Commander John Reginald Dowling,  (5 July 1923 – July 2000) was a Royal Air Force (RAF) officer and helicopter pilot famous for placing the spire of the rebuilt Coventry Cathedral on 22 April 1962. He was a Lancaster bomber pilot during the Second World War, and the author of RAF Helicopters: The First Twenty Years, a comprehensive overview of the RAF's early helicopters and their uses.

Dowling was born in Withington Manchester, the son of Dr Stephen Dowling and Mrs Kathleen Dowling (née Gilmore). One of four children, he was educated at Ampleforth College and practised Catholicism all of his life.

References

1923 births
2000 deaths
British World War II pilots
British World War II bomber pilots
Helicopter pilots
British military personnel of the Indonesia–Malaysia confrontation
Members of the Order of the British Empire
Recipients of the Distinguished Flying Cross (United Kingdom)
Recipients of the Air Force Cross (United Kingdom)
Royal Air Force wing commanders
Royal Air Force personnel of the Malayan Emergency
Military personnel from Manchester
People educated at Ampleforth College